Iniobong Edo Ekim  (born 23 April 1982) is a Nigerian actress. Ini Edo began her film career in 2000, and has featured in more than 100 movies since her debut. In 2013, Ini Edo was a judge for the Miss Black Africa UK Pageant. In 2014, Miss Ini Edo was appointed by the United Nations as a United Nations Habitat Youth Envoy.

Early life and education
Ini Edo is an Ibibio from Akwa Ibom state located in the south-south part of Nigeria, not far from Calabar. Her mother was a school teacher, and her father a church elder. Ini Edo had a strict upbringing, the second of four children, three girls, one boy. She attended Cornelia Connely College in Uyo, Nigeria. She graduated from the University of Uyo where she got a Diploma in Theatre Arts. She also completed her bachelor's degree program at the University of Calabar where she studied English. In 2014 she got a scholarship to study law at the National Open University of Nigeria.

Career
Her acting career started in 2000 with her debut in Thick Madam. Ini Edo was discovered by a producer at the audition she attended. Her breakthrough came in 2004 when she acted in World Apart. She has appeared in over 100 films. She earned a "Best Lead Actress" nomination at the 11th Africa Movie Academy Awards for her performance in the movie "While you slept"

Ini Edo, however, in 2017, made it clear that only hardwork, delight and dedication can get one to the top in the Nollywood industry as there are many distractions. But she encouraged that with determination, one would get there.

In 2021, she debuted a luxury fashion and cosmetic brand called Secrets Of April, which offers High Fashion Apparel, beauty products and accessories for unique expressions, rich and famous.

She represents the National Democratic Institute (NDI), an NGO that works to improve the efficacy of democratic institutions, as an ambassador

.

In 2023, Ini Edo produced ShantyTown, a 2023 Nigerian crime thriller released to Netflix on 20 January 2023.

Personal life
In 2008, Ini Edo married Philip Ehiagwina an American-based business man. The marriage ended in September 2014 after six years.
Ini Edo had her first child, a girl through surrogacy in the year 2021

Philanthropy
She is the founder of GEMS (Girls Empowerment Mentorship Scheme) AFRICA an NGO built to support young women in different fields providing mentorship, skills acquisition and support. Through Gems Africa she has been able to touch the lives of over 10000 African girls across a broad spectrum of industries.

Endorsement
Ini Edo was Glo brand ambassador for ten years from 2006 to 2016.
In 2010 she was named to be the brand ambassador of Noble Hair.
 Ini Edo is brand ambassador of Slim Tea Nigeria.
In 2019 she was signed as an ambassador for the @MrTaxi_NG brand.

Political appointment
Ini Edo was appointed as the Special Assistant to the Akwa Ibom State Governor on culture and tourism by Udom Gabriel Emmanuel in 2016.

Awards and nominations

Filmography

Fatal Seduction
The Greatest Sacrifice
My Heart Your Home
No Where to Run
Stolen Tomorrow
Sacrifice for Love
Silence of the Gods 
Supremacy 
Too Late to Claim 
Total Control
Traumatised
War Game
11:45... Too Late
The Bank Manager
The Bet 
Cold War 
Crying Angel 
Desperate Need 
Emotional Blackmail 
I Want My Money 
Last Picnic
Living in Tears 
Living Without You 
Men Do Cry 
My Precious Son 
One God One Nation 
Weekend getaway
Pretty Angels
Red Light 
Royal Package 
Security Risk 
Songs of Sorrow 
Stronghold 
Tears for Nancy 
Unforeseen 
Eyes of Love
Faces of Beauty 
Indecent Girl
Indulgence 
I Swear 
Legacy
Love Crime 
Love & Marriage 
Negative Influence
Not Yours!
The One I Trust
Sisters On Fire
Royalty Apart
Never Let Go
End of Do or Die Affair
Darkness of Sorrows
Final Sorrow
Behind The Melody
Memories of The Heart
Royal Gift
Dangerous 
Save The Last Dance
Battle For Bride
Caged Lovers
In The Cupboard
Hunted Love
Anointed Queen
A Dance For The Prince
Bride's War
Tears In The Palace
Slip of Fate
At All Cost
Mad Sex
The Princess of My Life
Inale (2010)
I'll Take My Chances (2011)
Nkasi The Village Fighter
Nkasi The Sprot Girl
The Return of Nkasi
 Soul of a Maiden
 "Blood is Money"
Citation (film)(2020)

See also 
 List of Nigerian actresses

References

External links

 

Actresses from Akwa Ibom State
Living people
21st-century Nigerian actresses
University of Calabar alumni
University of Uyo alumni
1982 births
Nigerian film actresses
National Open University of Nigeria alumni
Nigerian film producers
Nigerian film award winners
Nigerian women in business
Nigerian film directors
Nigerian women's rights activists
Nigerian television personalities